The Yeni Mosque (|) is a historical Ottoman-era mosque in the town of Edessa, Macedonia, Greece, and it is the only surviving mosque of the town. It now functions as a museum.

History 
Based on the monument's morphology and its mention by Ottoman explorer and traveller Evliya Çelebi in 1668, the mosque can be dated to mid-1600s. The mosque was made into a museum in 1942, and it is open to visitors.

Structure 
It is a building measuring 15x20 metres and it is sıxteen metres high, with elaborate proportions. It has a square prayer hall with a hemispherical dome, which is covered with scaly tiles. An open colonnaded porch with three low domes with corresponding covering adjoins the northern face, while the tall minaret is in the northwest corner. The building sports thirty-three windows in total.

Inside the mosque, the mihrab (praying niche) is preserved on the south wall of the building, as well as two wooden square balconies at the corners, which are accessed by stairs opening into the thickness of the wall. A long wooden portico (which no longer exists) used to ran along the northern wall, as is inferred from the corresponding access stairs that once led to it as well as to the mosque's minaret.

Inside, the painted decoration of the dome is also preserved, organized in a radial arrangement. Triangular partitions are decorated with repeating geometric shapes and floral motifs, stars with crescents and heart-shaped clams, elements belonging to the artistic vocabulary of the 19th century. Peripherally, at the base of the dome, excerpts from the Quran are imprinted.

See also 
 Islam in Greece
 List of mosques in Greece
 Chios Byzantine Museum

References

Further reading 
 Edessa, City of Waters by Roula Palanta, published in 1992.

Buildings and structures in Edessa, Greece
Ottoman mosques in Greece
Former mosques in Greece
Museums in Central Macedonia
Macedonia under the Ottoman Empire
Mosque buildings with domes